FC Derbent was a Russian football team from Derbent. It played professionally in 1966–1970, 1992 and 1995–1996. The best result they achieved was 4th place in Zone 2, Subgroup 2 of the Soviet Second League in 1969.

Team name history
 1966–1968: FC Urozhay Derbent
 1970–1991: FC Vinogradar Derbent
 1992–1994: FC Altair-Khelling Derbent
 1995–1996: FC Derbent

External links
  Team history at KLISF

Association football clubs established in 1966
Association football clubs disestablished in 1997
Defunct football clubs in Russia
Sport in Dagestan
1966 establishments in Russia
1997 disestablishments in Russia
Derbent